Naldecon, a brand name for phenylephrine, is a sympathomimetic drug and decongestant commonly prescribed in the 1950s.

In popular culture

Elvis' pill bottle, with the Naldecon removed, was sold at auction for over $2,600.

References

Antihistamines
Decongestants